Seema Biswas (born 14 January 1965) is an Indian actress who works in Hindi films and the theatre. She gained prominence after playing the role of Phoolan Devi in Shekhar Kapur's film Bandit Queen (1994), for which she won the National Film Award for Best Actress. She won the 2000 Sangeet Natak Akademi Award and the 2006 Best Actress Genie Award for her role as Shakuntala in Deepa Mehta's Water (2005). Her other mainstream films include Khamoshi: The Musical (1996), for which she won the Screen Award for Best Supporting Actress, Bhoot (2003), Vivah (2006) and Half Girlfriend (2017). In addition to films, Biswas has appeared in many television shows.

Personal life and education
Biswas was born in Nalbari, Assam, to Jagdish Biswas and Meera Biswas. After completing her primary education, she graduated in political science with honours from Nalbari College, Assam. She studied dramatic arts at the National School of Drama in New Delhi.

Career
Biswas played the lead in Krishnan Kartha's Amshini (Hindi), it entered the Indian Panorama Section of Filmotsav 1988. However, the general belief is that she debuted after Shekhar Kapur watched her perform in the NSD Repertory Company and offered her a role in Bandit Queen. Although she had earlier acted in Assamese cinema, this was her first big break into Hindi cinema.

In 1996, she played the role of Flavy, a deaf and mute woman in Sanjay Leela Bhansali's Khamoshi: The Musical opposite Nana Patekar and won the Screen Award for Best Supporting Actress.

Rooted firmly in theatre, she refuses to be typecast, and has worked in a variety of films and character roles. She has also worked in Marathi, Malayalam and Tamil films. Some of her Marathi films are Bindhast, Dhyaas Parwa and Lalbaug-Parel.

She has been honoured with the Life Membership of International Film And Television Club of Asian Academy Of Film & Television by the director Sandeep Marwah.

In 2014, Biswas was a jury member of the 45th International Film Festival of India, held from 20 to 30 November at Goa.

Filmography

Films

Television

Web series

Awards

Notes

External links

 

Recipients of the Sangeet Natak Akademi Award
Living people
Indian film actresses
National School of Drama alumni
Best Actress Genie and Canadian Screen Award winners
People from Nalbari district
People from Nalbari
Bengali actresses
1965 births
20th-century Indian actresses
21st-century Indian actresses
Actresses in Hindi cinema
Best Actress National Film Award winners
Best Supporting Actress Genie and Canadian Screen Award winners
Filmfare Awards winners
Screen Awards winners
Actresses in Tamil cinema
Actresses in Malayalam cinema
Actresses in Marathi cinema
Actresses in Assamese cinema
Actresses from Assam
Actresses in Hindi television
Actresses in Punjabi cinema
Actresses in Gujarati cinema
Actresses in Konkani cinema
Actresses in Bhojpuri cinema
Actresses in Bengali cinema